The U.S. state of Florida first required its residents to register their motor vehicles in 1905. Registrants provided their own license plates for display until 1918, when the state began to issue plates, becoming the last of the contiguous 48 states to do so.

Plates are currently issued by the Florida Department of Highway Safety and Motor Vehicles. Only rear plates have been required since 1922.

Passenger baseplates

1918 to 1974
The 1955 (dated 1956) issue was the first Florida license plate that complied with these standards.

1974 to present

County coding, 1938–77
Florida used numeric county codes on its license plates between 1938 and 1977, with the order of the codes based on the populations of each of the state's 67 counties according to a 1935 census. There was also code 68 on plates ordered from the state tag office in Tallahassee, and code 90 on replacement plates.

Vehicle classes, 1932–77
Between 1932 and 1977, Florida used letters on its license plates that corresponded to the class of vehicle.

Through 1937, the letters were placed before or after the numeric part of the serial, depending on the year. When county codes (above) were introduced in 1938, the letters were placed before the code (e.g. G10-123 for a commercial truck in Broward County). From 1939 onwards, the letters were placed after the code, but before the rest of the serial (e.g. 10G-123).

Throughout this period, license plates without letters were used on passenger cars. In 1932 and 1933, they were used on cars weighing 3,000 lb and under; from 1934 through 1941, on cars weighing between 2,051 and 3,050 lb; and from 1942 through 1947, on cars weighing between 2,001 and 2,500 lb. From 1948 onwards, they were used on cars weighing between 2,501 and 3,500 lb, as there were now more heavy cars.

Non-passenger plates
The state issues many non-passenger types of license plates to various vehicle classes and types.

Personalized plates
Florida offers personalized license plates for an extra fee, on the standard orange blossom design and on specialty designs (below). On the orange blossom design and specialty designs with centered graphics, combinations can consist of between one and seven characters specified by the registrant, including letters, numbers, spaces and hyphens. On specialty designs with left-aligned graphics, combinations are limited to a maximum of five characters, and on the Motorcycle Specialty plate, they are limited to a maximum of six characters.

Specialty plates
Florida has offered over 120 specialty license plates to its motorists, most for an extra fee. Some of these plates are no longer issued, while others have been redesigned since they were first issued.

Only Virginia and Texas have offered more specialty plates than Florida.

Collegiate

Environmental/Wildlife

Special Interest

Sports

Military

Special Military

Other

Discontinued

References

External links
Florida license plates, 1969–present
Florida DMV listing of specialty plates
Florida license plates

Florida
Transportation in Florida
Florida transportation-related lists